Marsh Township may refer to the following townships in the United States:

 Marsh Township, Surry County, North Carolina
 Marsh Township, Barnes County, North Dakota

See also 
 Marsh Creek Township, Mahnomen County, Minnesota
 Marsh Grove Township, Marshall County, Minnesota